The James River Reserve Fleet (JRRF) is located on the James River in the U.S. state of Virginia at  near Fort Eustis. James River Reserve Fleet, a "ghost fleet,",  is part of the National Defense Reserve Fleet. The Reserve Fleet ships in storage, called "mothballed", that can be ready for use if needed. Many are awaiting scrapping due to the age or condition of the ship. Some ships are used for target practice or as artificial reefs. A few ships became museum ships and other sold to private companies. Ships can be readied for use in 20 to 120 days during national emergencies or natural disaster.  The U.S. Department of Transportation's Maritime Administration (MARAD) provides oversight of the James River Reserve Fleet.  For the United States Navy ships the United States Navy reserve fleets stored these ships and submarines.

The James River Reserve Fleet is the oldest National Defense Reserve Fleet (NDRF) opened in 1919. At the start of World War II all 300 ships in the fleet were put into service. The current Reserve Fleet was opened in 1946 to store and maintains the many surplus ships after World War II.  Some ships there were reactivated for Korean War, Vietnam War and 600-ship Navy program. In the 1950s the fleet had over 800 ships, with all fleets having over 2,000 ships stored. Many of the ships were World War II Liberty ships and Victory ships.  The other large Reserve Fleets in the 1950s are the Suisun Bay Reserve Fleet inland from San Francisco Bay and the Beaumont Reserve Fleet in Texas. , nine ships remain in the fleet.

Special projects
The fleet was used for surplus grain storage. Liberty ships laid up in the James River Reserve Fleet were used by the Commodity Credit Corporation for storage of surplus grain. In 1950s the United States Department of Agriculture purchased and store surplus grain in ship's cargo holds.

The James River Reserve Fleet is also used for training. Team train for search-and-seizure, hostage rescue,  helicopter approach then hover and more.

Part of the Reserve Fleet is a newer program called Ready Reserve Force (RRF).

Inventory
:

Notable former ships
USS Guadalcanal (LPH-7), amphibious assault ship, was used as a target off Virginia Capes in May 1995. She was used to recover Gemini and Apollo astronauts in Atlantic Ocean.

SS Charles H. Cugle, became the SS Sturgis (MH-1A), was a Liberty ship used to test nuclear power. A nuclear power plant was placed in her, used at the Panama Canal, scrapped in 2015.

USNS General Hoyt S. Vandenberg (T-AGM-10). Sunk as an artificial reef in May 2009 off Key West.

USS General Nelson M. Walker was a Troopship used in World War II, the Korean War and the Vietnam War. Art Beltrone, a military historian, found troop art in the stored ship, now on display.

NS Savannah was stored for 14 years at James River, the first nuclear power cargo ship.

USS Simon Lake (AS-33) a submarine tender, stored from 2015 to 2019, until scrapped.  

USS Donner (LSD-20) leaked 1,000 gallons of fuel in 2000.

USS Suribachi (AE-21) a  scrapped in 2019.

SS Red Oak Victory, now a museum ship in Richmond, California. A Boulder Victory-class cargo ship.

SS American Victory, a Victory cargo ship now a museum ship in Tampa, Florida.

SS Arthur M. Huddell Liberty ship, now a Greek museum ship.

SS John W. Brown Liberty ship, now a museum ship in Baltimore, Maryland.

USS Waccamaw (AO-109), an oil tanker.

MS Sea Witch (1940) Type C2 cargo ship.

SS California (1927), the first major ocean liner built with turbo-electric transmission.

USS Albemarle (AV-5), one of two Curtiss-class seaplane tenders, part of Operation Flat Top.

MV Freedom Star, a NASA recovery ship.

USS Kittiwake (ASR-13) and USS Ortolan (ASR-22), submarine rescue vessels.

USS Escape (ARS-6), a Diver-class rescue and salvage ship.

USNS LCPL Roy M. Wheat, a cargo ship built in the Soviet Union, delivering supplies to United States Marine Corps, into Fleet March 31, 2021. 

USS Gage (APA-168), last existing Haskell-class attack transport.

MV Cape Lambert (T-AKR-5077) and MV Cape Lobos (T-AKR-5078), Roll-on/roll-off ships in fleet 1987 to 1990. Activated in 1990 to support Operation Desert Storm and Desert Shield, back in fleet in 2000.

USS Matsonia (ID-1589), Troopship built in 1913.

See also
Atlantic Reserve Fleet, Norfolk
Project Liberty Ship
Naval Inactive Ship Maintenance Facility

References

External links

James River Association
 Satellite image of the Reserve Fleet in the James River near Fort Eustis, Virginia from Google Maps

United States Navy Reserve
Fleets of the United States Navy
National Defense Reserve Fleet
James River Reserve Fleet
James River Reserve Fleet Grain Program